The 2019–20 EBU Player of the Year Championship was the competition's sixth season. As per previous years, points were set to be accumulated over the EBU's ten most prestigious events from 1 October 2019 to 30 September 2020; However, COVID-19 led to the delay or cancellation of several events (as detailed below), leading to the season being declared incomplete.

List of Competitions

Summary of Results
Standings after four events are shown below. Due to COVID-19, the season was declared incomplete with no winner. It is unknown as to whether the Crockfords Cup finals, set to take place in September 2021, will contribute to these unofficial results.

This list displays the top ten players (including ties); 74 players received points. Winners of each event are highlighted in bold. NH indicates Not Held.

References

Contract bridge competitions
Contract bridge in the United Kingdom